Ian Preece (born 23 June 1982) is a Welsh former professional snooker player, from the city of Newport.

Preece first appeared on the main tour in 2003, after a successful career as a junior; he held the record as the youngest winner of the World Amateur Championship in 1999, when he beat David Lilley 11–8 in the final.

Career
Until 2009 his best runs were to the last 48 of tournaments, which he has achieved in the 2007 Welsh Open, 2007 China Open, 2007 UK Championship, and 2008 Shanghai Masters.
He reached the last 32 of an event for the first time at the 2009 Welsh Open with victories over Peter Lines, Andrew Higginson and Stuart Bingham but was beaten 0–5 by Stephen Maguire. However the remainder of the 2008–09 season was poor and saw him in danger of dropping off the main tour, however he was awarded a wildcard from World Snooker which enabled him to compete on the tour for the 2009–10 season. However, he was unable to keep his place and so has slipped off the main tour.

After six years out of the professional game, Preece reached the last 16 at Q-School Event One in 2016, losing 2–4 to Chen Zhe, and the same stage at Event Two, where he was defeated 4–1 by John Astley. However, these performances were sufficient for him to finish third on the Q-School Order of Merit, and he thus earned a two-year card to compete again on the main tour.

Preece won three matches in 2016 Shanghai Masters qualifying, but was denied a trip to China by David Gilbert losing out 5–2.

Performance and rankings timeline

Career finals

Pro-am finals: 1 (1 title)

Amateur finals: 4 (3 titles)

References

External links

 
 Profile on Global Snooker
Ian Preece at worldsnooker.com

Welsh snooker players
Sportspeople from Newport, Wales
1982 births
Living people